Park Sung-baek (born 27 February 1985) is a South Korean road bicycle racer, who currently rides for UCI Continental team . He competed at the 2012 Summer Olympics in the Men's road race, but failed to finish.

Major results

2003
 9th Overall Tour de Korea
2004
 4th Overall Tour de Korea
 5th Overall Tour de Hokkaido
1st Points classification
1st Stages 4 & 5
2005
 Asian Cycling Championships
1st  Team pursuit
1st  Elimination race
5th Road race
 1st Stage 4 Tour of Siam
 1st Stage 1 Tour de Korea
2006
 Asian Games
1st  Team pursuit
1st  Madison
3rd  Road race
 Asian Track Championships
1st  Team pursuit
1st  Madison
 Tour of Thailand
1st Stages 2 & 6
 6th Overall Tour de Korea
2007
 1st  Road race, National Road Championships
 1st  Overall Tour de Korea
1st Stages 1, 3, 5, 7 & 9
 Tour of Hong Kong Shanghai
1st  Points classification
1st Stage 1
 Tour de East Java
1st  Points classification
1st Stages 4 & 5
2008
 1st  Road race, National Road Championships
 9th Overall Tour de Taiwan
2009
 5th Overall Tour de Korea
2010
 Tour de Hokkaido
1st Stages 1 & 4
 5th Overall Tour de Singkarak
1st Stage 2
2011
 Asian Track Championships
1st  Team pursuit
1st  Points race
 1st Stage 2 Tour de Taiwan
 3rd  Team time trial, Summer Universiade
2012
 1st  Team pursuit, Asian Track Championships
 1st  Overall Tour de Korea
1st  Mountains classification
1st Stage 6
2013
 1st  Team pursuit, Asian Track Championships
 1st Stage 2 Tour of Japan
 2nd Road race, National Road Championships
2014
 1st Stage 8 Tour de Korea
 1st  Points classification Tour de Filipinas
 4th Road race, National Road Championships
2015
 Tour of Thailand
1st Stages 5 & 6
 3rd Time trial, National Road Championships
2016
 Jelajah Malaysia
1st  Points classification
1st Stage 5
2018
 5th Time trial, National Road Championships
2019
 5th Time trial, National Road Championships

References

External links

South Korean male cyclists
1985 births
Living people
Olympic cyclists of South Korea
Cyclists at the 2008 Summer Olympics
Cyclists at the 2012 Summer Olympics
South Korean track cyclists
Sportspeople from Seoul
Asian Games medalists in cycling
Cyclists at the 2006 Asian Games
Cyclists at the 2010 Asian Games
Cyclists at the 2014 Asian Games
Medalists at the 2006 Asian Games
Asian Games gold medalists for South Korea
Asian Games bronze medalists for South Korea
Universiade medalists in cycling
Universiade bronze medalists for South Korea
20th-century South Korean people
21st-century South Korean people